Peter Motzfeldt (3 August 1777 – 1 April 1854) was a Norwegian Military Officer and Government Minister. He served as a member of the Constitutional Assembly at Eidsvoll in 1814.

Background
Motzfeldt was born at Orkdal in Sør-Trøndelag, Norway. He was the son of infantry captain Ulrik Anton Motzfeldt (1738–83) and Andrea Birgitte Bull. When his father died in 1783, Motzfeldt lived with his uncle, Major Jacob Motzfeldt. He was a cousin of Frederik Motzfeldt and Carl Frederik Motzfeldt. In 1792, he entered the Artillery Academy in Copenhagen and became second lieutenants in the artillery with the station in Fredrikstad in 1796. He was stationed in the Danish West Indies and later held as a prisoner of war by Great Britain. In 1809, he became commander of an artillery corp in Bergen, Norway.

Political career
In 1814, he was elected as a representative from the Bergen Artillery Corp (Artillerie-Corpset) at the National Assembly in Eidsvoll. He supported the position of the Independence Party (Selvstendighetspartiet) and was a supporter of Crown Prince Christian Frederik and opponent of the union with Sweden. Motzfeldt was a member of the Council of State Division in Stockholm 1814–1816, 1818–1819, 1824–1825, 1828–1829, 1831–1832, and 1834–1835, Minister of the Army 1816–1818 and 1819–1822, and Minister of Auditing 1829–1831, 1832–1834, 1835–1836, and 1836–1837.

Personal life
He was married to Ernesta Birgitte Margrethe Stenersen (1789–1848). They were the parents of jurist Ulrik Anton Motzfeldt and government official Ketil Motzfeldt. Their daughter Jacobine Ida Sophie Motzfeldt married politician Christian Birch-Reichenwald. Their grandson was statesman, Ernst Motzfeldt. Peter Motzfeldt died during 1854 and was buried at Vår Frelsers gravlund in Oslo.

References

Other sources 

1777 births
1854 deaths
People from Sør-Trøndelag
Napoleonic Wars prisoners of war held by the United Kingdom
Norwegian prisoners of war in the Napoleonic Wars
Norwegian Army personnel
Government ministers of Norway
Fathers of the Constitution of Norway
Defence ministers of Norway